iNgwenyama (also Ingwenyama) is the title of the male monarch of Eswatini. In English, the title is sometimes translated as King of Eswatini. The iNgwenyama reigns together with the Ndlovukazi, a spiritual leadership position held by the iNgwenyama's mother or another female royal of high status. The Ndlovukati may serve as a Regent if the position of Ngwenyama is vacant.

Ingwenyama means "Lion" in Swati but in an honorific sense, as opposed to libhubesi, the usual way of referring to actual lions. The title is sometimes written Ingwenyama, iNgwenyama, or ingweinyama, with the prefix i- (plural ti-, tiNgweniyama), meaning "the king".

The current king is Mswati III, who has reigned since 1986. The annual budget allocated to the King and the royal household amounts to $61 million.

Powers

Economic 
In Eswatini, the iNgweinyama owns all minerals in Eswatini except for minerals owned by private corporations. The other aspects of mining are also controlled by the Ngwenyama.

Administrative 
The Ngwenyama can appoint 20 senators in the Senate of Eswatini and 10 members of the House of Assembly of Eswatini. The Ngwenyama is also the head of the judicial system. The Chairman of the Swazi National Council is also the Ngwenyama. Local officials that are responsible for the governance of Eswatini are either appointed by the Ngwenyama, or their superiors are appointed by the Ngwenyama.

Cultural 
Other powers the Ngwenyama has include, allocating land, starting national gatherings, disburse wealth, organize social events, and take part in rituals. The Ngwenyama has royal praise singers called griots. Royal praise singers would appear at public events and sing about the virtues of the Ngwenyama. Any offence against the Ngwenyama or Ndlovukati or their property was a heinous crime. It was illegal to wear the ruler's clothes, use their medicines, or be within a certain distance of them. Adultery with the Ndlovukati was treason, and the Ngwenyama could exile any citizen for any reason.

Religious importance 
During the Incwala the Ngwenyama will split the sacred water to the east and west to signal the end of the last year. On the second day of the Incwala youths will gather special branches and place them in a special sanctuary. Then the Ngwenyama will sing with his subjects in the sanctuary, thus reaffirming their loyalty. Later the Ngwenyama would light a fire. The purpose of the festival was to secure the prosperity of the Kingdom of Eswatini. The Ngwenyama can also cause rain.

History 
Sobhuza II played an important role in the modernization of Eswatini, not out of goodwill but to prevent revolution. The Royalist Imbokovdo party of Swaziland consistently wins the vast majority of seats, thus gaining total control over the government. This means that the Ngwenyama does not have to worry about opposition in the government. Ngwenyama Mswati III compromised the traditional tinkundla system, replacing parts of the system with the modern Eswatini institutions.

Succession 
The Ngwenyama will be succeeded by one of his male sons. The son who will become Ngwenyama will be chosen based on the virtue of his mother. The Ngwenyama has ingatiyebukoshi, which is the blood of kingship. If cattle is given to the Ngwenyama by the tribe his wife is from, the mother is "the mother of the people of the country." Her son, the heir to the throne, will be known as the "child of the people."

See also 
List of monarchs of Eswatini

References

Swazi monarchy
History of Eswatini
Politics of Eswatini
Swazi words and phrases
Monarchies of South Africa
Titles of national or ethnic leadership